Ilija Kolarić was a Serbian painter.

Biography
Ilija Kolarić was born in Novi Sad on January 27, 1926. He began his career as a painter at a Military technical institute and then worked in the studios of Petar Lubarda, Milo Milunović, Đorđe Ilijić, and Anton Huiter. Later, he worked as a freelance artist. In his youth, he was trained to be a pilot. He held several exhibitions throughout the former Yugoslavia, as well as in other countries such as Moscow, Paris, Brussels, Warsaw, Munich, Philadelphia, and others. He spent over 50 years of his life married to his wife Ljubica, who outlived him. He left behind a personal legacy in the town of Mošorin. His works are included in many museums and private collections. He mainly painted landscapes, still lifes, and interiors, and his style is characterized by a realistic approach to the subject, with a particular attention to light and color. He passed away on December 3, 2004 in Novi Sad.

Style and genre inclinations
Ilija Kolarić's paintings are dominated by pastoral motifs and attempts to convey the role of the atmosphere in different ways. His main inspiration was the Vojvodina landscape, which he returned to throughout his life. From an early age, and particularly during his youth, he was interested in oriental themes (Baghdad's Lullaby), and especially in oriental rugs. During his pilot career, Kolarić begins to deal with the theme of aviation, which will later often take an important place in his work (Icarus).

In Kolarić's works, the technique of sfumato is the dominating one, in which critics often compared him to Flemish masters.

Contribution

Notable Paintings and Cycles

"Baghdad's Lullaby"
"Icarus"
"Silence"
Cycle "Man and Space"
Cycle "Amazon Women"

Documentary Films about Kolarić

"All Kolarić's Loves" (1992)
"Dancing in the Frame" (2001).

See also
Petar Lubarda
Milo Milunović

Notes
Various sources on the internet incorrectly state that Kolarić passed away in 2003.

Bibliography 

Serbian painters
1926 births
2004 deaths
People from Novi Sad